Pablo Arnoldo Torrealba [tor-ray-ahl'-bah] (born April 28, 1948) is a Venezuelan former professional baseball pitcher. He played in Major League Baseball (MLB) from 1975 through 1979 for the Atlanta Braves, Oakland Athletics, and Chicago White Sox.

Listed at 6' 1" (1.78 m), 185 lb.(78 k), Torrealba batted and threw left handed. He was born in Barquisimeto, Lara. His son, Steve Torrealba, is a former catcher
who also played for the Braves organization.

In a five-season career, Torrealba posted a 6–13 record with 113 strike outs and a 3.27 ERA in 239 innings pitched.

See also
 List of Major League Baseball players from Venezuela
 List of second-generation Major League Baseball players

External links
 or Retrosheet
 Mexican League statistics
 Venezuelan Professional Baseball League statistics

1948 births
Living people
Atlanta Braves players
Cardenales de Lara players
Charros de Jalisco players
Chicago White Sox players
Diablos Blancos de Unión Laguna players
Greenwood Braves players
Gulf Coast Braves players
Iowa Oaks players
Leones del Caracas players
Llaneros de Portuguesa players
Major League Baseball pitchers
Major League Baseball players from Venezuela
Mexican League baseball pitchers
Minor league baseball coaches
Oakland Athletics players
Sportspeople from Barquisimeto
Richmond Braves players
Savannah Braves players
Tigres de Aragua players
Venezuelan baseball coaches
Venezuelan expatriate baseball players in Mexico
Venezuelan expatriate baseball players in the United States